A subligaculum was a kind of undergarment worn by ancient Romans. It could come either in the form of a pair of shorts, or in the form of a simple loincloth wrapped around the lower body. It could be worn both by men and women. In particular, it was part of the dress of gladiators, athletes, and of actors on the stage. Leather subligacula have been found in excavations of 1st century Roman London.

The longer-form subligaculum that forms a loin cloth is tied as follows: First, the strings are tied around the waist with the long part hanging down back, covering the buttocks. Next, the long part is brought down between the legs and pulled up behind the knot tied in front. Then it is draped over the ties so it forms a loincloth.

See also

 Kacchera
 Kaupinam
 Dhoti
 Lungi
 Breechcloth
 Fundoshi
 Loincloth
 Mawashi
 Perizoma
 Thong
 Tallit katan
 Temple garment

Notes

Roman-era clothing
Undergarments